Lim Jock Seng (born January 22, 1944) is a Bruneian politician who served as Second Minister of Foreign Affairs & Trade. He was a member of the Legislative Council of Brunei during his tenure as Minister.

Early life and education
Lim Jock Seng was born in Muara town on January 22, 1944. He graduated with a Bachelor of Science in economics from Swansea University, Wales and received a Master of Philosophy in social anthropology from the London School of Economics.

Career

Early roles
He joined the civil service on July 23, 1969, starting his career as a curator in the Museums Department. He entered the Diplomatic Service Department in 1982. After he joined the Ministry of Foreign Affairs in Brunei, he first held roles such as Director General of ASEAN Department, then the Director of Politics and the Brunei Darussalam High Commissioner to New Zealand.

In 1986, Lim Jock Seng's The Inter-relationship of Technology, Economy and Social Organization in a Fishing Village in Brunei was published in the  Brunei Museum Journal, one of six monographs published since 1970 by the journal.

In October 1986, he was named Permanent Secretary of the Ministry of Foreign Affairs. From 2001 until 2003, he was international chair on the Pacific Economic Cooperation Council. He was also afterwards a member of the ASEAN Eminent Persons Group.

Second Minister of Foreign Affairs
On May 24, 2005, he was named Second Minister of Foreign Affairs, after being appointed to the position by Pehin Orang Kaya Pekerma Dewa in 2004. Before he was re-appointed as Foreign Minister, he served as the chairman of both Brunei Shell Petroleum Company Sendirian Berhad and Royal Brunei Airlines.

In January 2016 he met with Japanese Foreign Minister Fumio Kishida. At that time, Seng's official role was "Minister at Prime Minister's Office and Second Minister of Foreign Affairs and Trade of Brunei Darussalam." He was also a member of the Brunei Legislative Council.

Personal life
Pehin Lim is married to Datin Lim Bee Yong.

Honours

National 

  Order of Setia Negara Brunei First Class (PSNB) – Dato Seri Setia

Foreign
  :  
  Honorary Commander of the Order of Loyalty to the Crown of Malaysia (P.S.M.) – (2015)

  : 
 Honorary Fellow & Honorary Doctorate Honorary degree Swansea University – (1991)

See also
List of current foreign ministers
List of foreign ministers in 2017
Cabinet of Brunei
Ethnic Chinese in Brunei

References

External links
About Lim Jock Seng

1944 births
Living people
Alumni of Swansea University
Knights Commander of the Most Exalted Order of the Star of Sarawak
Alumni of the London School of Economics
Members of the Legislative Council of Brunei
Bruneian people of Chinese descent
High Commissioners of Brunei to New Zealand
Honorary Commanders of the Order of Loyalty to the Crown of Malaysia